Ferroviário Atlético Clube was a Brazilian football club based in Maceió, Alagoas. The team last participated in the Campeonato Alagoano Segunda Divisão in the 2000 season. They won the Campeonato Alagoano twice.

History
The club was founded on 1 May 1937. Ferroviário won the Campeonato Alagoano in 1953 and in 1954, sharing the 1953 title with ASA.

Achievements

 Campeonato Alagoano:
 Winners (2): 1953, 1954

Stadium
Ferroviário Atlético Clube play their home games at Estádio Cleto Marques Luz. The stadium has a maximum capacity of 4,000 people.

References

Association football clubs established in 1937
Defunct football clubs in Alagoas
1937 establishments in Brazil